Bakouma Airport  is an airstrip serving Bakouma, a village in the Mbomou prefecture of the Central African Republic.

See also

Transport in the Central African Republic
List of airports in the Central African Republic

References

External links 
OpenStreetMap - Bakouma
OurAirports - Bakouma Airport
FallingRain - Bakouma Airport

Airports in the Central African Republic
Buildings and structures in Mbomou